Homalocantha zamboi is a species of sea snail, a marine gastropod mollusk in the family Muricidae, the murex snails or rock snails.

Description

Distribution

Mascarene Basin

Found in Red Sea near Phillipians.

References

External links

Muricidae
Gastropods described in 1960